160P/LINEAR is a periodic comet in the Solar System. The comet came to perihelion on 18 September 2012, and reached about apparent magnitude 17.

References

External links 
 Orbital simulation from JPL (Java) / Horizons Ephemeris
 160P on Seiichi Yoshida's comet list
 Elements and Ephemeris for 160P/LINEAR – Minor Planet Center

Periodic comets
0160

Astronomical objects discovered in 2004